Christos Vartzakis (1911 – 7 September 2009) was a Greek marathon runner. He won the Greek Championship in 1948 and 1953.

Between the ages of 36 and 79, Vartzakis participated in a university study on the effects of ageing on performance.  The study showed that his average speed decreased by 30% over a period of 43 years.

References

Further reading
Tsagkarakis, Kostas; Christos Vartzakis: Running is my life; General Secretariat for the Olympic Games, 2004. 

1911 births
2009 deaths
Greek male marathon runners
20th-century Greek people